Mohona Television, also known as Mohona TV, stylized as mohona tv, is a Bangladeshi Bengali-language privately owned satellite and cable television channel. It is headquartered in Pallabi, Mirpur, Dhaka. The channel primarily broadcasts news and entertainment programming, including films and musical programming.

History 
Member of Parliament Kamal Ahmed Majumder-owned Mohona Television was granted a broadcasting license by the Bangladesh Telecommunication Regulatory Commission, along with other privately owned Bangladeshi television channels, on 20 October 2009. The channel commenced test transmissions on 31 July 2010, and officially began broadcasting on 11 November 2010 with the "Banglar Proticchobi" (বাংলার প্রতিচ্ছবি) slogan, with the intention to promote the Bengali culture and language using newer technology. On 28 May 2017, the managing director of Mohona Television, Ziauddin Ahmed Makumder, had died. Mohona Television commenced high definition broadcasts on 1 February 2021.

Programming 
 Ajker Banalata Sen
 Drishtikon
 Nil Jyotsnae Kalo Sap
 Ronger Songsar
 Surer Mohona
 Talkana
 Quick Marriage

Gallery

See also
 List of television stations in Bangladesh

References

External links

Television channels in Bangladesh
Television channels and stations established in 2010
Mass media in Dhaka
2010 establishments in Bangladesh